Lochlan Watt (born 1987) is an Australian radio announcer, journalist, record label owner and musician from Samford, Queensland. He is currently based in Melbourne.

Career 

He has hosted Triple J's heavy music show The Racket since February 2012. He runs the Monolith label, and has contributed to various print and online publications, with a regular column appearing in Time Off/The Music from 2010-2014. Watt has performed primarily as a vocalist in such groups as Colossvs, Nuclear Summer, Ironhide, Porky's Butthole, The Surrogate, Western Decay and Thy Art is Murder. Watt filled in for vocals with Thy Art Is Murder on their Coffin Dragger tour.

References

External links
Triple J profile

1987 births
Living people
Triple J announcers
Australian heavy metal singers
Musicians from Queensland
21st-century Australian singers